Dalwin J. Niles (September 5, 1914 – January 1979) was an American lawyer and politician from New York.

Life
He was born on September 5, 1914, in Schenectady, New York. He graduated from Union College, and from Albany Law School in 1937. He was admitted to the bar in 1938, and in 1939 began to practice law in Johnstown, Fulton County, New York. He married Mary Heagle, and they had two sons. During World War II he served in the U.S. Army, attaining the rank of major.

He was the Judge of the Fulton County Children's Court (renamed Family Court in 1962) from 1953 to 1964. In June 1964, he defeated the incumbent State Senator Walter Van Wiggeren in the Republican primary. Van Wiggeren ran in November 1964 on the Conservative ticket for re-election, but was defeated again by Niles.

Niles was a member of the New York State Senate from 1965 to 1972, sitting in the 175th, 176th, 177th, 178th and 179th New York State Legislatures.

He died in January 1979.

Sources

1914 births
1979 deaths
Politicians from Schenectady, New York
Union College (New York) alumni
Albany Law School alumni
Republican Party New York (state) state senators
People from Johnstown, New York
United States Army officers
New York (state) state court judges
20th-century American lawyers
20th-century American judges
Military personnel from Schenectady, New York
20th-century American politicians